Grace Sakura Rolek (born October 10, 1997) is an American actress. She is best known for voicing Connie Maheswaran, Steven's best friend and eventual girlfriend on the Cartoon Network animated series Steven Universe (2013–2019) and its two follow-ups, Steven Universe Future (2019–2020) and Steven Universe: The Movie (2019).

Career
Rolek is known for voicing Connie Maheswaran on Steven Universe, as well as for appearing in Happiness Is a Warm Blanket, Charlie Brown, radio host for Appalachia radio in Fallout 76, and Final Fantasy VII: Advent Children. She also made voice acting appearances in Cloudy with a Chance of Meatballs, Kung Fu Panda: Secrets of the Furious Five and Horton Hears a Who!.

She made several public appearances as a guest of many fan conventions and gatherings, such as Cartoon Fair in France, Florida Supercon in Miami, and Beach City Con in Virginia Beach.

Personal life
Rolek was born on October 10, 1997 in Burbank, California and began her career in voice acting in 2004.

She is of African-American, Italian, Polish and Japanese descent.

Rolek is bisexual.

Filmography

References

External links

 

1997 births
Bisexual actresses
LGBT people from California
Living people
Actresses from Burbank, California
American people of Polish descent
American people of Italian descent
African-American actresses
American actresses of Japanese descent
American voice actresses
American film actresses
American television actresses
American film actors of Asian descent
21st-century American actresses
21st-century American singers
21st-century African-American women singers
American bisexual actors